Guglielmo Bossi (8 September 1901 – 8 May 1962) was an Italian cyclist. He competed in the sprint event at the 1924 Summer Olympics.

References

External links
 

1901 births
1962 deaths
Italian male cyclists
Olympic cyclists of Italy
Cyclists at the 1924 Summer Olympics
Cyclists from Milan